Amorosa (The Revenge) is a 2012 Filipino psychological horror drama film directed by Topel Lee, starring Angel Aquino, Enrique Gil, and Martin del Rosario. This film was produced by Skylight Films and released last August 29, 2012, by Star Cinema.

This is the first horror film of Xyriel Manabat.

Synopsis
Years ago, Amorosa (Angel Aquino), her husband, and her two boys Amiel and Rommel (Martin del Rosario and Enrique Gil) got into a car accident. Her husband died in the accident, leaving her alone to take care of her boys. In the present, she decides to move her family to a remote pension house. But once there, she discovers that the house is home to an angry spirit seeking revenge for sins committed years ago. And as she deals with the fear of this spirit popping up everywhere, she struggles to reconnect with Rommel, who hasn’t been the same since the accident.

Cast 

Angel Aquino as Rosa dela Cruz  
Martin del Rosario as Amiel dela Cruz
Enrique Gil as Rommel dela Cruz
Empress Schuck as Sandra Bernardo
Carlo Aquino as Jerry Bernardo
Ejay Falcon as William Reyes
Jane Oineza as Amanda Reyes
Joseph Marco as Peter Reyes
Jake Cuenca as Alfred Reyes
Loisa Andalio as Jamie Reyes
Maris Racal as Agnes Reyes
Ahron Villena as Alberto S. Reyes
Wendell Ramos as Benny
Alex Medina as Carlo
Arjo Atayde as Steven
Victor Silayan as Harry
Richard Yap as Oscar
JC De Vera as Ryan
Bernard Palanca as Patrick
Dominic Roque as Juan
Jay Manalo as Artie
Marco Gumabao as Restito
Xyriel Manabat as Nadia

Reception
The film received R13 rating. The maindie film was released the same week with the musical film I Do Bidoo Bidoo. It earned an estimated P11,738,087 on its first five days well ahead of I Do Bidoo Bidoo. Amorosa grossed P25,201,412 in 2 weeks according to Box Office Mojo. It ranked 2nd Top Grossing Independent Film of 2012 and one of the 20 Top Grossing Filipino films of 2012.

Nominations 
29th Star Awards for Movies
-Indie Movie of the Year nominee
-Indie Movie Director of the Year nominee
-Indie Movie Screenwriter of the Year nominee

See also 
List of ghost films

References

External links

Amorosa at Box Office Mojo

2012 films
Mosang films
Philippine psychological drama films
Philippine psychological horror films
2012 horror films
Star Cinema films
Skylight Films films
2010s psychological horror films
Filipino-language films
Films directed by Topel Lee